Shout! The Story of Johnny O'Keefe is a two part Australian dramatisation about the life of musician Johnny O'Keefe from his peak success in the 1950s. The project was written by Robert Caswell.

Cast 

 Terry Serio as Johnny O'Keefe
 John McTernan as Gordon
 Marcelle Schmitz as Marianne
 Candy Raymond as Maureen 
 Tony Barry as Alan Heffernan 
 John Paramor as Bill Haley
 Steve Shaw as Catfish Purser
 Greg Stone as Deejay Doublebass
 John Polson as Deejay Saxophone
 Robert Alexander as Brother Marzorini
 Russell Newman as Ray O'Keefe
 Nick Holland as Smythe
 Ritchie Singer as Max Moore
 Roger Ward as Police Sergeant
 Leanne Bundy as Widgie
 Jan Ringrose as Sally 
 Simone Taylor as Dixie
 Rob Thomas as Festival Manager 
 Chuck McKinney as Little Richard 
 Liz Harris as Valda Marshall 
 Nique Needles as Col Joye 
 Arthur Sherman as Clay
 Alton Harvey as Ed Sullivan
 Elizabeth Burton as Stripper 
 Diana Davidson as Matriach
 Robbie McGregor as Australian Doctor
 Slim DeGrey as Taxi Driver
 Ian 'Molly' Meldrum as Himself 
 Donna Gubbay as Bit Part
 Chris Hession as Bit Part
 Greg Curran as Bit Part
 Paul Flaherty as Bit Part
 Ross Higgins as Voice Overs 
 Kellie Turner as Girl in pub

Soundtrack

Charts

References

External links
Shout! The Story of Johnny O'Keefe at IMDb

1985 Australian television series debuts
1985 Australian television series endings
1980s Australian television miniseries
English-language television shows